Old St. Paul's Methodist Episcopal Church is a historic Methodist Episcopal church located on High Street in Odessa, New Castle County, Delaware. It was designed by noted Philadelphia architect Samuel Sloan and built in 1851–1852. It is a two-story, brick building in the Greek Revival style. It measures 45 feet by 65 feet and has a low-pitched gable roof. The building ceased use as a church in 1955 and houses a local museum and cultural center.

It was listed on the National Register of Historic Places in 1982.

References

Methodist churches in Delaware
Churches on the National Register of Historic Places in Delaware
Greek Revival church buildings in Delaware
Churches completed in 1852
19th-century Methodist church buildings in the United States
Churches in New Castle County, Delaware
National Register of Historic Places in New Castle County, Delaware
Individually listed contributing properties to historic districts on the National Register in Delaware
1852 establishments in Delaware